Nepal competed at the 2004 Summer Paralympics in Athens, Greece. The team included 1 woman, but won no medals.

Sports

Athletics

Women's field

See also
Nepal at the Paralympics
Nepal at the 2004 Summer Olympics

References 

Nations at the 2004 Summer Paralympics
2004
Summer Paralympics